Columbus Regional Airport Authority (CRAA) oversees the operations of John Glenn Columbus International Airport, Rickenbacker International Airport, and Bolton Field airports in the Columbus metropolitan area.

The Columbus Regional Airport Authority was created in 2003 when the Columbus Airport Authority merged with the Rickenbacker Port Authority.

External links
Columbus Regional Airport Authority
Transportation in Columbus, Ohio
Airport operators of the United States
Government of Columbus, Ohio

References